Jizhou District is a district of the city of Ji'an, Jiangxi province, People's Republic of China.

Administrative divisions
In the present, Jizhou District has 7 subdistricts and 4 towns.
7 subdistricts

4 towns

External links
  Government site -

References

Jizhou